Beinn a' Chlaidheimh (Scottish Gaelic: "Hill of the Sword", 914 m) is a remote mountain in the Northwest Highlands, Scotland. It lies in the wild Dundonnell and Fisherfield Forest in Wester Ross.

A steep and distinctive shaped peak, it is often climbed as part of the "Fisherfield Six", in conjunction with five nearby Munros.

Beinn a' Chlaidheimh was listed as a Munro itself until 2012, however it was found to come up just 44 cm short of the required 914.40 m height required for a Munro, and was subsequently downgraded to Corbett status.

References

Mountains and hills of the Northwest Highlands
Marilyns of Scotland
Corbetts